Semikhah is the traditional Jewish name for rabbinic ordination.

The original semikhah was the formal "transmission of authority" from Moses through the generations. This form of semikhah ceased between 360 and 425 CE. Since then semikhah has continued in a less formal way. Throughout history there have been several attempts to reestablish the classical semikhah.

In recent times, some institutions grant ordination for the role of hazzan (cantor), extending the "investiture" granted there from the 1950s. Less commonly, since the 1990s, ordination is granted for the role of lay leader – sometimes titled darshan.

The title of "rabbi" has "proliferated greatly over the last century". 

Nowadays semikha is also granted for a limited form of ordination, focused on the application of Halakha in specific settings as opposed to underlying Talmudic knowledge. 
Outside Orthodox Judaism, in fact, the curriculum may emphasize "the other functions of a modern rabbi such as preaching, counselling, and pastoral work".

Related terminology
Semikhah may refer to the "conferring" of the ordination, or as a noun, to the certification itself, where the plural is Semakhot (or Semachot); one with ordination may then be referred to as a Musmach.
A precedent Biblical usage is Numbers 8:10, describing the preparation of the Levites for service. 

A rabbi is also sometimes referred to as a Moreh Hora'ah (מורה הוראה) "one who teaches [Halakhic] decisions", while the ordination itself is called Heter Hora'ah (היתר הוראה) "permission to make Halakhic decisions", certifying that the holder has the facility to apply his "thorough knowledge of the Talmud" to the facts of a given halakhic question, and (implicitly) certifies also that the candidate is suitable to function as a community rabbi.
These terms derive from Leviticus 10:11, where the requirement is specified that halakhic decisions are to be made only by a qualified authority.

Concept

In concept, semikhah represents a "bond" (masorah) dating back to the time of Moses (Moshe) and Joshua (Yehoshua); see above re. "Hora'ah". It is held that Hashem taught the Torah to Moshe Rabbeinu (Moses) on Mount Sinai in 1312 BCE and that since that time, the knowledge of Torah has been passed from generation to generation by the conferment of semikhah, rabbinic ordination, or the unbroken transmission of authority dating back to that time. This unbroken chain of Torah teaching is thus said to have continued for over 3,300 years, and continues to this day.

The ancient formula for semikhah was "Yoreh Yoreh. Yadin Yadin". ("May he decide? He may decide! May he judge? He may judge!"); and in the early days of rabbinical Judaism any ordained teacher could ordain his students.
Classical semikhah was granted by a court of three judges, and it later required the participation of at least one who had attained this status, himself. According to Maimonides the other two need not be semukhim.

Today, semikha is generally through an institution, a yeshiva or specialized kollel, but is often granted by an individual.
The testing here
confirms one's ability to decide ("") a question in halakha (Jewish law). The examination has a dual concern: firstly it confirms knowledge of the law as presented in Shulchan Aruch, the standard code of law (with more recent applications from relevant teshuvot, or responsa); secondly, it also confirms an understanding of the underlying principles, by testing the relevant Talmudic sugyas, together with their development in the Rishonim and Acharonim, especially the Tur; see .

Varieties of ordination
The Talmud lists three classes of semikhah issued: Yoreh Yoreh, Yadin Yadin, and Yatir Bechorot Yatir; while the first two are still issued, the last is not.
Additional forms of semikhah issued in modern times are discussed below.
 Yoreh Yoreh (Hebrew: יורה יורה): The recipient of this semikhah demonstrated sufficient education and proper judgment to be able to render halakhic judgments on matters of religious law as it pertains to daily life, focusing on kashrut, referred to as "Issur v'Hetter", and niddah (both from Shulchan Aruch Yoreh De'ah), and permissible or forbidden activities on Shabbat and Yom Tov (Orach Chaim). The holder of this Semikha, as above, is referred to also as a Moreh Hora'ah and the ordination itself is called Heter Hora'ah.
 Yadin Yadin (Hebrew: ידין ידין, Ashkenazi pronunciation: Yoden Yoden): The recipient of this semikhah demonstrated sufficient education and proper judgment to be able to render halakhic judgments on matters of religious law as it pertains to monetary and property disputes; the basis here is the Choshen Mishpat section; this semikhah is usually required for a rabbi to act as a dayan (rabbinic judge), and, typically, is granted only to those already holding Yoreh Yoreh.
 Yatir Bechorot Yatir: The recipient of this semikhah demonstrated sufficient education and proper judgment to determine the ritual status of firstborn animals that have developed a blemish. This degree required extensive veterinary knowledge. See .

Many Yoreh Yoreh programs, for example the Chief Rabbinate's and RIETS, include testing in Avelut (Laws of mourning; Yoreh Deah) and/or Jewish marital law (Even Ha'ezer section). 
Traditionally – and on the other hand – Yoreh Yoreh covered kashrut only, and this is still often the case.
Although apparently limited,
the basis here is that, as mentioned, semikha is in fact a confirmation of the ability - and right - of the holder to pasken in general, and that, as required, the rabbi can correctly apply his Talmudic and Halakhic knowledge to other areas (and where necessary refer complex cases to a posek, a more qualified authority; see ). 
A semikha focusing on the laws of Shabbat is sometimes granted, similarly. 
Often, niddah will require a separate specialized certification, as – given their intricate and sensitive nature – an element of shimush, or "apprenticeship", pertains particularly to these halakhot. 
(Note that shimush more generally, is (implicitly) required before one serves as a Rabbi.) 
It is not uncommon for a rabbi to hold several certificates, with each semikha covering a specific area of halakha.
Certification, with similar testing, is also required for one to qualify as a shochet, mohel, sofer, or menakker; these inhere a major practical element, and thus require significant shimush.

Modern semakhot
As outlined, additional forms of semikhah are issued in modern times 

with their content departing from the above, to an extent reflecting

the contemporary Rabbinic role.
See  for further outline.

An Orthodox semikha, "Rav U'Manhig", "(pulpit) Rabbi and (community) leader", essentially testifies that the recipient has sufficient Torah knowledge to serve in a position of leadership (as "rabbi" essentially means "teacher", not necessarily "halakhic authority"). The testing here covers Orach Chaim extensively, usually with limited emphasis on the underlying Talmudic sugyas.

Pluralistic and non-denominational movements grant an ordination titled "Rav U-moreh/morah BeYisrael", "Rabbi and Teacher in Israel". The curriculum here, as above, may emphasize "the other functions of a modern rabbi such as preaching, counselling, and pastoral work", as opposed to Halakha; further, often in these institutions less emphasis is placed on Talmud and Jewish law, "but rather on sociology, cultural studies, and modern Jewish philosophy". 
See .

In contrast to these, the Chief Rabbinate of Israel confers the further advanced semikhah of "Rav Ir", "[Chief] Rabbi of a City". This covers additional relevant topics from all sections of Shulchan Aruch - such as gerut - and, as for Dayanut, has Yoreh Yoreh as a prerequisite; see .

Ordination ceremony
The ceremony where ordination is conferred is known as Chag HaSemikhah, the festival of ordination. Today in most branches of Judaism, there is no laying on of hands; ordination is conferred as an academic degree with a diploma, signed by the officiating rabbis, often hand-written on parchment.
In fact, receiving ordination has been a festive occasion accompanied by celebration since Talmudic times. According to the Talmud, when the rabbis ordained Rabbi Zeira, they sang a bridal song in his honor: "Even though she painted not her eyes with antimony, neither darkened her cheeks with rouge, nor plaited her hair, she is still a graceful doe [of exceptional beauty]!" the analogy and implication being: just as a bride is inherently beautiful, so for ordination, one's Torah knowledge must be immediately apparent. 
They also sang at the ordination of Rabbi Ammi and Rabbi Assi: "Just like these, just like these, ordain for us!"; epitomizing, as they did, the ideal candidate for oridnation. This wording - כל מן דין סמוכו לנא - as per the certificate displayed, is still often included on semikhah diplomas.

Contemporary usage
In the prevailing sense, "" generally refers to the ordination of a rabbi within all modern Jewish religious movements from Reform to Orthodox.

This "" signifies the transmission of rabbinic authority to give advice or judgment in Jewish law, thus overlapping to some extent with the classical usage, per #Concept above; see also .
In this context, "Rav Muvhak" is sometimes used to refer to a student's primary teacher.

, ordination as a cantor, similarly signifies the transmission of authoritative knowledge about Jewish musical and liturgical traditions. This is granted within some denominations.

Status of current rabbis
Although presently most functioning synagogue (i.e. "pulpit") rabbis hold semikhah, this was until quite recently not always required, and in fact many Haredi rabbis may possibly not be required to hold a "formal" semikhah even though they may occupy important rabbinical and leadership positions. The reasons being that what is prized in the communities they serve and lead is most of all a supreme mastery of the Talmud with a vast knowledge of the commentaries of the Rishonim and Acharonim and Responsa, added to knowledge of the Shulchan Aruch and Halakha ("Jewish Law"). In the UK, a communal minister who does not have semikhah has the title "Reverend" rather than "rabbi".

Many Hasidic rebbes and Rosh yeshivas of major Orthodox yeshivas are not required to "prove" to their flocks that they do or do not hold formal semikhah because their reputations as Torah-scholars and sages is unquestioned and esteemed based on the recommendations of trusted sages, and the experiences and interactions that many knowledgeable Torah-observant Jews have with them, which thus gives practical testimony based on experience that these great rabbis are indeed worthy to be called as such.

For example, according to some reports Rabbi Yisrael Meir Kagan (known as the Chafetz Chayim) did not officially receive semikhah until late in life, when a formal rabbinic qualification was necessary for him to call himself "rabbi" on an immigration application. Most current poskim, however, do have semikhah.

Just as a debate exists about who is a Jew, there is little consensus as to who is a rabbi. The Reform movement in a Responsa states that for their Temples, pulpit rabbis need to attend and complete their academic program at the Reform movement's rabbinic schools. But they further state that this does not negate other sects of Judaism from accepting the time-honored semikhah of one-on-one. Nor do they deal with the issue of rabbis who are not pulpit rabbis but teach, study, and do research. They do say that the need for three rabbis is unneeded as the two additional rabbis are just witnesses and cannot attest to the new rabbi's knowledge.

Ordination of cantors
Many cantorial institutions in the United States currently grant  to their students. Some have historically used the term investiture to describe the conferral of cantorial authority onto their graduates.

The term investiture was originally intended to make a distinction between the ordination of rabbis and that of cantors. However, in response to the increased responsibility of the cantor in contemporary American synagogues, some institutions such as Hebrew Union College (Reform) have recently begun to use the term "ordination" instead of "investiture." Other institutions that ordain cantors include Hebrew College (pluralistic), the Academy for Jewish Religion (pluralistic), and Aleph (Renewal).

As of 2021, the Jewish Theological Seminary (Conservative) will begin ordaining its cantors.

Modern Lay Leader Ordination
Beginning in the mid to late 1990's, the Reform, Renewal and Conservative Jewish movements have ordained lay leaders to positions such as spiritual director, darshan (chaplain), and pastor.
Lay leaders within Judaism serve both in formal spaces like synagogues, independent minyan, in Jewish and non-Jewish organizations, hospitals and community centers.

Several yeshivas and other academies now train and certify lay leaders, such as Darshan Yeshiva, ALEPH Pastor Program, the Union for Reform Judaism,
and AJRCA's chaplaincy school

Classical semikhah
Classical semikhah refers to a specific type of ordination that, according to traditional Jewish teaching, traces a line of authority back to Moses, The Men of the Great Assembly, and the Great Sanhedrin. The line of classical semikhah is generally believed to have died out in the 4th or 5th century CE, but it is widely held that a line of Torah conferment remains unbroken.

Hebrew Bible
According to the Hebrew Bible, Moses was the greatest prophet, and the one individual who received the Torah from God.
Traditionally Moses is also assumed to be the "first rabbi" of the Israelites. He is still known to most Jews as Moshe Rabbeinu ("Moses our rabbi").

Moses, before his death, ordained Joshua as his successor by resting his hands on Joshua:

And Moses spoke unto the LORD, saying: 'Let the LORD, the God of the spirits of all flesh, set a man over the congregation ...'  And the LORD said unto Moses: 'Take thee Joshua the son of Nun, a man in whom is spirit, and lay thy hand upon him; and set him before Eleazar the priest, and before all the congregation; and give him a charge in their sight. And thou shalt put of thy honour upon him, that all the congregation of the children of Israel may hearken.' ... And Moses did as the LORD commanded him; and he took Joshua, and set him before Eleazar the priest, and before all the congregation.  And he laid his hands upon him, and gave him a charge, as the LORD spoke by the hand of Moses.

This procedure caused the "spirit" in Moses to enter Joshua as well:
Joshua son of Nun was filled with a spirit of wisdom, because Moses had laid his hands on him. The Israelites therefore listened to him, doing as God had commanded Moses.

Similarly, when Moses found the task of leadership too difficult, God caused the "spirit" in Moses to enter 70 additional elders (though no resting of hands is mentioned here).

According to later tradition, the elders later ordained their successors in the same way. Their successors in turn ordained others. This chain of hands-on semikhah continued through the time of the Second Temple, to an undetermined time.

Mishnah and Talmud
Despite the name, the classical semikhah did not actually require a literal laying on of hands; the operative part of the ceremony consisted of a court of three, at least one of whom himself had semikhah, conferring the authority on the recipient. Both the givers and the recipient had to be in the Land of Israel, but they did not have to be in the same place. In the Mishnaic era it became the law that only someone who had semikhah could give religious and legal decisions.

The title ribbi (or "rabbi") was reserved for those with semikhah. The sages of the Babylonian Jewish community had a similar religious education, but without the semikhah ceremony they were called rav. The Talmud also relates that one can obtain the title of rabbi by those to whom he teaches or counsels.

After the failed revolution by Bar Kokhba in 132–135 CE, the Romans put down the revolt, and the emperor Hadrian tried to put a permanent end to the Sanhedrin. According to the Talmud, Hadrian decreed that anyone who gave or accepted semikhah would be killed, any city in which the ceremony took place would be razed, and all crops within a mile of the ceremony's site would be destroyed. The line of succession was saved by Rabbi Yehuda ben Bava, who took five students of the recently martyred Rabbi Akiva to a mountain pass far from any settlement or farm, and ordained all five students. When the Romans attacked them, Rabbi Yehuda ben Bava blocked the pass with his body allowing the others to escape, and became one of Judaism's ten Rabbinic Martyrs himself by being speared 300 times. The five new rabbis – Rabbi Meir, Rabbi Shimon, Rabbi Yehudah, Rabbi Yose and Rabbi Eleazar ben Shammua – escaped and became the next generation of Torah leadership.

The exact date that the original semikhah succession ended is not certain. Many medieval authorities believed that this occurred during the reign of Hillel II, around the year 360 CE. However, Theodosius I forbade the Sanhedrin to assemble and declared ordination illegal. (Roman law prescribed capital punishment for any rabbi who received ordination and complete destruction of the town where the ordination occurred). It seems to have continued until at least 425, when Theodosius II executed Gamaliel VI and suppressed the Patriarchate and Sanhedrin.

Post-Talmudic: The decline of classical semikhah
The original line of succession seems to have died out in the 4th or 5th centuries. The Geonim, early medieval Jewish sages of Babylon, did not possess semikhah, and did not use the title "rabbi". They were formally known as "rav" and were entrusted with authority to make legal and religious decisions.

Some believe that classical semikhah may have even survived until the 12th century when semuchim from Lebanon and Syria were traveling to Israel in order to pass on semicha to their students. Others, such as Rav Yisroel of Shklov (1770–1839), believed semikhah may not have been broken at all but that it continued outside of the land of Israel.

Since the end of classical ordination, other forms of ordination have developed which use much of the same terminology, but have a lesser significance in Jewish law (see Rabbi#Middle Ages).

Attempts to revive classical semikhah

Maimonides ruled that "if all the sages In Israel would unanimously agree to appoint and ordain judges, then these new ordinants would possess the full authority of the original ordained judges". Based on this ruling, in 1538 Rabbi Jacob Berab attempted to reestablish semikhah in Safed. This attempt attracted some prominent supporters, including Rabbi Yosef Karo (author of the Shulchan Aruch), who himself received semikhah from Berab, and then gave semikhah to others. However, other rabbis ruled that Berab's semikhah was invalid. In any case, Berab's chain of semikhah died out again after several generations.

Berab's attempt was the model for several other attempts to revive semikhah and reestablish the Sanhedrin, including one attempt in Israel in 2004.

See also 

List of rabbinical schools
Master of Rabbinic Studies

Rabbinic Judaism

Notes

Further reading 

Julius Newman: Semikhah (ordination). A study of its origin, history, and function in Rabbinic literature. Manchester University Press. Manchester 1950.

External links 
Rabbi Yaakov Beirav's attempt to re-establish a Sanhedrin in 1538
130 "Documented" "Generations" of Semicha, from Mt. Sinai to the present
Rabbi Judah Leib Maimon, "Renewing the Sanhedrin in our New State" (English translation)
Curriculum for the Semikhah Tests of the Chief Rabbinate of Israel

Jewish law and rituals
Jewish courts and civil law
Rabbis
Hebrew words and phrases in Jewish law